William John Montagu Watson-Armstrong, 2nd Baron Armstrong  (10 October 1892 – 6 July 1972) was a British and Canadian aristocrat and soldier.

Early life 
Armstrong was born in 1892 as the first child of the businessman William Watson-Armstrong and Winifreda Jane (née Adye). When Armstrong was 11 in 1903, his father was created Baron Armstrong after inheriting his industrialist great-uncle's wealth but not title in 1900, at which point he became The Hon William Watson-Armstrong. Armstrong was educated at Eton and then Trinity College, where he received a first class degree in history in 1914.

Military service 
Commissioned into the 7th Battalion of the Northumberland Fusiliers in the Territorial Force in 1913, Armstrong served during World War I as a captain in France and Belgium, being mentioned in despatches and severely wounded in the Second Battle of Ypres in 1915, and invalided home in November 1917. Thereafter he served in India for a year from 1918 to 1919.

Personal life 
Armstrong married Zaida Cecile Drummond-Wolff in 1917 in Billere during the Great War. Their only child, William Henry Cecil John Robin Watson-Armstrong, was born in 1919.

Diplomatic service 
In 1924, Armstrong moved to Canada, where he was appointed Consul for Siam, and after five years promoted in 1929 to Consul-General, where he stayed in post until 1942, through the Siamese revolution of 1932 to do so on behalf of Thailand. For his service, he was appointed Commander of the Order of the Crown of Siam and Commander of the Order of the White Elephant.

In 1941, Armstrong's father died, and he succeeded as 2nd Lord Armstrong. He remained in Canada.

In 1942, Armstrong became Consul of the Netherlands for British Columbia and Yukon, serving until 1946, for which he was appointed Commander of the Order of Orange-Nassau.

Retirement and death 
Following World War II, Armstrong returned to the UK in 1946, splitting his time between Cragside and Bamburgh Castle.

Armstrong died in 1972, and was succeeded by his son.

References

External links 
 A portrait of Armstrong as a young boy by Mary Lemon Waller
 A souvenir celebrating Armstrong's coming of age on his 21st birthday, held by the National Trust
 A photographic portrait of Lord and Lady Armstrong in 1953 held by the National Portrait Gallery, London

1892 births
1972 deaths
Barons Armstrong
Commanders of the Order of Orange-Nassau
Royal Northumberland Fusiliers officers